Edwin Leonard  (November 17, 1823 – April 5, 1900) was a Sergeant in the Union Army and a Medal of Honor recipient for his actions in the American Civil War. He is buried in the Elm Street Cemetery in West Springfield, Massachusetts.

Medal of Honor citation
Rank and organization: Sergeant, Company I, 37th Massachusetts Infantry. Place and date: Near Petersburg, Va., June 18, 1864. Entered service at: Agawam, Mass. Birth: Agawam, Mass. Date of issue: August 16, 1894.

Citation:

Voluntarily exposed himself to the fire of a Union brigade to stop their firing on the Union skirmish line.

See also

List of Medal of Honor recipients for the American Civil War: G–L

References

External links

1823 births
1900 deaths
United States Army Medal of Honor recipients
Union Army soldiers
People from Agawam, Massachusetts
People of Massachusetts in the American Civil War
American Civil War recipients of the Medal of Honor